Team BRIT is a British auto racing team formed in 2015 and based at Dunsfold Aerodrome in Surrey, home of the Top Gear test track. The team is composed of disabled drivers and competes in three British motor racing series, the British GT Championship, Britcar Endurance and Britcar Trophy, with the ultimate aim to race in 24 Hours of Le Mans

The key element which allows physically disabled drivers to compete is the specially developed hand control system fitted to all the cars.

History 
Team BRIT was formed as an offshoot of the charity Kartforce, which provides military veterans with the opportunity to take part in karting events to support their physical and mental rehabilitation and recovery. Team BRIT gives people with disabilities the chance to compete with able bodied drivers in national motor racing events. 1996 Formula One world champion Damon Hill is a patron of the team.

From its inception in 2015 with a single small racing car and three former military disabled drivers, the team has grown in size and scope.

By 2022 it consisted of five cars and eight drivers with diverse backgrounds and disabilities, competing in three racing competitions.

History of Cars Available 

2015, 2016 - VW Golf GTI

2017 - 2 x Fun Cup Volkswagen Beetle

2018 - 3 x Fun Cup Volkswagen Beetle, Vw polo gti, Aston Martin Vantage GT4

2019, 2020 - 3 x BMW 116i, Aston Martin Vantage GT4

2021 -  BMW 118i, Aston Martin Vantage GT4, BMW M240i Racing

At the end of 2021 the Vantage GT4 chassis became ineligible for competition in British GT, which follows SRO Motorsports Group international homologation rules. The team continued to campaign it in the Britcar Endurance Championship where it remained eligible in the equivalent "Class D" under Britcar series rules. 

2022 - BMW 118i, Aston Martin Vantage GT4, BMW M240i Racing, McLaren 570S

2023 - Plans announced for 2023 include:
- the addition of a C1 vehicle, adapted and entered to the SIlverlake C1 Endurance Series  which includes a 24h round at the Silverstone circuit.
- the addition of a second McLaren 570S replacing the Aston Martin in the Britcar Endurance Championship.
- The other McLaren 570S will continue in British GT.
The BMW M240i Racing will continue in the Britcar Trophy Championship.

The Aston Martin is to be sold, as is the Golf Gti Academy car which is being replaced by the BMW 118i .

Hand Control Technology 
Team BRIT worked with MME Motorsport, a Slovenian race engineering specialist, to develop hand control systems for throttle, clutch, gear change, and brakes which work in a seamlessly integrated way with conventional controls. The integration allows a driver using hand controls to share a car with a driver using conventional controls in events; the car will respond to both sets of controls, giving priority to whichever input is highest if there is a conflict.

The growing development and realism of Sim racing systems allows a disabled driver to use the same steering wheel on the simulator as the racing car which aids a more seamless transition from Sim racer to track racer.

Championship Results

2022 
Team BRIT drivers James Whitley and Chris Overend made history in 2022 becoming the first disabled team to win a British national motor racing championship, claiming the Britcar Trophy Championship in an adapted BMW M240i Racing.

In Britcar Endurance the team ran the Aston Martin Vantage GT4 in class D with six classes in each race.

 Position in teams - 7th 
 Position in class - 4th

In British GT Championship the team ran the McLaren 570S in class GT4 ProAM with four classes in each race.

While the MacLaren was entered for a couple of races in Britcar Endurance, it wasn't registered for the championship but took part as an invitational entry.

 Position in GT4 Teams - 9th
 Position in GT4 Drivers - 11th
 Position in GT4 ProAM class - 2nd

In Britcar Trophy the team ran the  BMW M240i Racing in class 2 and the BMW 118i in class 3 with five classes in each race

 Position in teams - 1st and 26th
 Position in class - 1st and 6th

Gallery

References

External Links
 https://teambrit.co.uk/
 https://www.britinsurance.com/culture/team-brit
 https://news.sky.com/story/meet-team-brit-the-uks-only-disabled-motorsport-outfit-12722150
 https://www.dailysportscar.com/2021/10/27/team-brit-for-british-gt-in-2022.html
 https://www.activityalliance.org.uk/news/4673-team-brit-opens-the-door-to-motorsport-for-disabled-drivers
 https://www.salisburyjournal.co.uk/news/21158361.team-brit-supports-spinal-patients-salisbury-hospital/
 https://www.skysports.com/f1/news/12433/10505961/team-brit-how-motorsport-is-inspiring-injured-troops
 https://www.accessandmobilityprofessional.com/teen-racer-amputee-back-hot-seat-tuc-team-brits-help/
 https://www.ukhaulier.co.uk/news/road-transport/innovation/transport-industry-comes-together-to-support-team-brit-racing/
 https://disabilityhorizons.com/2019/03/team-brit-and-nicolas-hamilton-launch-the-uks-first-racing-academy-for-disabled-drivers/
 https://headtopics.com/uk/meet-team-brit-the-uk-s-only-disabled-motorsport-outfit-30786734
 https://metro.co.uk/2022/08/10/autistic-racing-driver-shares-how-motorsport-changed-his-life-17160155/
 https://www.texacolubricants.com/en_uk/home/brand-ambassadors/team-brit.html
 https://www.britishgt.com/team/221/team-brit
 https://www.adrianflux.co.uk/motorsport/team-brit-overcame-disabilities-professional-drivers/
 https://www.sussexlive.co.uk/news/sussex-news/eastbourne-paralympian-24-wins-first-7125804
 https://uk.rs-online.com/web/generalDisplay.html?id=footer1/release/220420_rs-motorsport-apr-22
 https://www.bbc.co.uk/news/av/technology-57930083
 https://www.daytona.co.uk/team-brit-at-british-gt-championship/
 https://shdcomposites.com/news/shd-backs-team-brit
 https://www.iambenpritchard.com/team-brit-track-day/
 https://kenwoodcommunications.co.uk/comm/case-studies/digital/team-brit/
 https://boldcolours.co.uk/team-brit-sponsors
 https://realbusiness.co.uk/team-brit-diversifying-motorsports
 https://www.dailyecho.co.uk/news/20012044.solent-university-students-work-team-brit/
 https://www.inyourarea.co.uk/news/eastbourne-paralympian-extends-racing-championship-lead-with-team-brit/
 https://www.rhinoproducts.co.uk/team-brit/
 https://www.solwaydaf.co.uk/news/news-archive/daf-dealer-network-backs-team-brit-disabled-racing-team/
 https://www.lampfilms.co.uk/team-brit
 https://loopagency.co.uk/2020/12/03/synetiq-supplies-a-winner-to-team-brit/
 https://allthingsbusiness.co.uk/2022/05/04/rs-champions-access-to-motorsport-with-sponsorship-of-all-disabled-team-brit/

British auto racing teams